Margot Bærentzen (12 May 1907 – 16 October 1983) was a Danish fencer. She competed in the women's individual foil at the 1928 Summer Olympics.

References

External links
 

1907 births
1983 deaths
Danish female foil fencers
Olympic fencers of Denmark
Fencers at the 1928 Summer Olympics
People from Kongens Lyngby
Sportspeople from the Capital Region of Denmark